The Sweden men's national volleyball team represents Sweden in international men's volleyball competitions and friendly matches. The team's biggest success came in 1989, when Sweden won the silver medal at the 1989 European Championship in Örebro and Stockholm, from September 23 to October 1.

Results

Olympic Games
 1988 — 7th place

World Championship
 1990 — 10th place
 1994 — 16th place

European Championship
 1971 — 17th place
 1985 — 9th place
 1987 — 4th place
 1989 —  Silver medal
 1991 — 10th place
 1993 — 11th place

European League
 2017 —  Bronze medal

References
 Swedish Volleyball Federation

Volleyball
National men's volleyball teams
Men's national team
Men's sport in Sweden